The 1991 WLAF season was the inaugural season of the World League of American Football and was the first transatlantic sports league. The regular season began on March 23, and concluded on May 27. The postseason ran from June 1 until June 9, when the London Monarchs defeated the Barcelona Dragons 21–0 in World Bowl '91 at Wembley Stadium in London, England.

Attendances
Average game attendance was 25,361. At London, Barcelona, Frankfurt and Montreal, attendances surpassed early expectations. The Monarchs' home attendance led the league, with an average of 40,481 in the regular season. The dress rehearsal for the World Bowl, London v Barcelona at Wembley in week 10, attracted 50,835 fans, while the same week Frankfurt v Sacramento received a bigger crowd, 51,653, with around 10,000 more fans turned away. The World Bowl was attended by 61,108.

Regular season

Week 1

Week 2

Week 3

Week 4

Week 5

Week 6

Week 7

Week 8

Week 9

Week 10

Standings

  Division winners.
  Wild card qualifier for playoffs.
  New York/New Jersey won North American East title based on head-to-head record (1–0) versus Orlando.

Postseason

Bracket

All-World League team

Offense

Defense

Specialists

References

NFL Europe (WLAF) seasons
WLAF season, 1991